Constituent Assembly elections were held in Venezuela on 27 October 1946, following a coup the year before which launched El Trienio Adeco. The result was a victory for Democratic Action, which won 137 of the 160 seats in the Assembly. Voter turnout was 86.6%.

Results

Seats won by state

References

1946 in Venezuela
Venezuela
Elections in Venezuela
Election and referendum articles with incomplete results
October 1946 events in South America